This is a list of mayors who served the city of Huntsville, Alabama.

From 1812 to 1828, a board of trustees governed Huntsville, headed by a popularly elected president:

The first President of Huntsville is unknown.
1816–1819: Nicholas Pope
1819–1821: John Brahan
1821: Benjamin Pope 
1821–1822: John Read
1822–1823: John W. Tilfordy
1823–1824: John Boardman
1824: William B. Long (Resigned)
1824–1825: John Boardman
1825–1826: Thomas Humes
1826–1828: John H. Lewis

From 1828 to 1844, popularly elected aldermen selected the President of Huntsville:
1828–1829: William H. Campbell
1829: John H. Lewis (Resigned)
1829–1830: James G. Birney
1830–1831: John Martin
1831–1832: Samuel Cruse
1832–1833: George Fearn
1833–1834: Samuel Peete
1834–1835: Samuel Peete (Resigned in 1834 and was re-appointed)
1835–1836: Unknown
1836–1842: Elisha H. Rice
1842–1844: George P. Beirne

From 1844 to 1916, Presidents of Huntsville were again elected by the people, with a President/Council system from 1844 to 1911 and a City Commission form of government from 1911 to 1916:

1844–1849: Joseph Clark
1849–1850: George P. Beirne
1850–1851: Edwin R. Wallace
1851–1853: William Echols Jr.
1853–1854: Samuel Peete (Resigned)
1854: Joshua Beadle
1854–1855: William Figures
1855–1859: Zebulon P. Davis
1859–1860: John J. Ward (Resigned)
1860: John James Coleman
1860–1861: Zebulon P. Davis (Resigned)
1861–1865: Robert W. Coltart
1865–1866: Zebulon P. Davis
1866–1867: Robert W. Colart (Removed by Union Army)
1867–1868: E. B. Clapp (Put in office by Union Army, later resigned)
1868–1870: William B. Figures (Approved by Union Army to replace Clapp)
1870–1872: William F. Mastin (Died)
1872: James L. Cooper
1872–1874: John A. Erwin
1874–1878: Jere Murphy
1878–1882: Zebulon P. Davis
1882–1883: Thomas W. White
1883–1889: Edmond I. Mastin
1889–1893: Jere Murphy
1893–1897: W. T. Hutchens
1897–1899: Jere Murphy
1899–1903: Alfred Moore
1903–1907: Thomas W. Smith
1907–1908: R. Erle Smith
1908–1910: Thomas W. Smith
1910–1913: R. Erle Smith
1913–1914: R. L. O'Neal
1914–1915: Dr. J. D. Humphrey
1915–1916: Milton H. Lanier

In 1916, returned to the Mayor/Council form of government, with the office of the President finally being officially retitled to Mayor:

1916–1918: T. T. Terry
1918–1920: Henry B. Chase
1920–1922: W. T. Hutchens
1922–1926: Dr. Fraser L. Adams
1926–1952: Aleck W. McAllister
1952–1964: R. B. "Speck" Searcy, Jr.
1964–1968: Glenn Hearn
1968–1988: Joe W. Davis
1988–1996: Steve Hettinger
1996–2008: Loretta Spencer, Huntsville's first female mayor
2008–2022: Tommy Battle
2022-2022: Jackie Reed (Died and was honorary mayor for 1 meeting)
2022-present: Tommy Battle

See also
 Timeline of Huntsville, Alabama

References

Huntsville, Alabama
 Huntsville